Frederick John Finch (6 October 1895 – 18 April 1952) was an Australian rules footballer who played with Hawthorn in the Victorian Football League (VFL).

Early life
The son of George Fagan and Ellen Berry, Frederick John Finch was born at Brunswick on 6 October 1895.

Fred Finch enlisted to serve in World War I in late 1914 and served until the end of the war.

Cricket
Finch was an accomplished cricketer and played for Northcote Cricket Club in the Victorian District cricket competition from 1920 to 1922. He was a fast bowler and took a hat-trick against Fitzroy in the 1920–21 season.

Football
After a stint with Burwood Football Club, Finch joined Hawthorn at the start of the 1922 season when Hawthorn was in the Victorian Football Association. He earned the nickname "Snowy" from his very fair hair and had a reputation for never missing a night's training. He played mostly in the centre, and won Hawthorn Football Club's best all-round player in their first season of VFL football. From 1927 to 1929 he played predominantly in the Hawthorn reserves team before retiring to football administration roles within the club.

Later life
In 1924 Finch married Dulcie May Jones (née Stokes) and they lived in Glen Iris, Victoria with her two children from her first marriage. 

Fred Finch died in 1952 at the age of 56.

Honours and achievements
Individual
 Hawthorn best all rounder: 1925
 Hawthorn life member

References

External links 

Fred Finch's playing statistics from The VFA Project

1895 births
1952 deaths
Hawthorn Football Club (VFA) players
Hawthorn Football Club players
Peter Crimmins Medal winners
Australian military personnel of World War I
Australian rules footballers from Melbourne
People from Brunswick, Victoria
Military personnel from Melbourne